Livingston is an unincorporated community in Clark County, Illinois, United States. Livingston is located along U.S. Route 40 northeast of Marshall.

References

Unincorporated communities in Clark County, Illinois
Unincorporated communities in Illinois